Hero Vardiwala is an Indian, Bhojpuri-language, action crime thriller streaming television series on ALTBalaji which is based on the famous novel Vardiwala Gunda by Ved Prakash Sharma. It is the first ever web series made in Bhojpuri language. The series stars Dinesh Lal Yadav A.K.A Nirahua as the protagonist along with Amrapali Dubey.

Cast

 Dinesh Lal Yadav "Nirahua"
 Amrapali Dubey 
 Ritu Singh

Reception 
According to Tarun Agarwal of The Quint, the series "clearly shows the image of real politics."

References 

Indian action thriller films